Shindigz is one of the United States' largest retailers of party supplies.

History
In 1926 Hubert Stump founded Stump Printing, Inc. (the original name of the company) in South Whitley, Indiana, a small town located just outside Fort Wayne, Indiana.  The original Stumps was started primarily as a local newspaper publisher and commercial printer. Local legend has it that in the depths of the Depression, Hubert Stump was left with one nickel that he could use to either buy a loaf of bread with or put in the church collection plate. Hubert decided to put the nickel in the collection plate. The very next day, he came up with the concept of the "Memorie" booklet, which was printed as a favor for High School Proms and Junior-Senior receptions. The "Memorie" booklet turned out to be a great success.

Over the next decade, Stumps continued to expand and began to print products for schools like menus, award certificates, lunch tickets, and athletic schedules. During the 1940s, Stumps expanded their product line to include crepe streamers, balloons, and even the very first large-area theme decorating kit called "Evening in Paris". In the 1960s, it introduced the first full-color catalog that featured a large selection of themed decorating kits. In 1962, Stumps moved to a new manufacturing and distribution facility located in South Whitley, Indiana.

Stumps grew rapidly during the 1970s and 1980s. Stumps not only created the first personalized favors offered to high-school students, but added a new special occasion catalog offering theme party concepts. In 1990, Shep and Wendy Moyle purchased Stumps.

In 1996, Stumps pioneered the first website devoted entirely to the Prom and party market.

Wendy Moyle & Norwood "Shep" Moyle moved back to the Fort Wayne area and took over operations of the company.  These two met while working for Frito Lay in Dallas and Shep was responsible for the successful launch of Restaurant Style Tostitos  chip before moving back to Fort Wayne.

In January 1999, Stumps unveiled the world's first on-line party superstore, Shindigz. This complete on-line catalog offered web shopping.

Shindigz, Spiritline, and Stumps party are all offshoots of the original Stumps Printing company and are all part of the Shindigz family of brands.

Shindigz was named "Entrepreneur of the Year" by Ernst and Young in 1999 and one of "Indiana’s 100 Fastest Growing Companies" by the Indiana University Kelley School of Business. In 2000, Forbes Magazine named Shindigz.com one of the "Top 400 Websites in America." In the July 2002 issue, Catalog Success magazine named five catalog industry professionals as winners of the first-annual Catalogers of the Year awards. Winners demonstrated innovation in cataloging, measurable company growth, and advancement to the catalog industry as a whole. According to Donna Loyle, editor of Catalog Success, the Business-to-Business Catalogers of the Year award was given to the Moyles because of their impressive business acumen. Since their purchase of Stumps in 1990, the Moyles have taken the company from a one-catalog company with 40 employees to a firm with three websites and over 225 employees. The company now serves the consumer, professional party planner and sports fan.

Shindigz hosted the annual Shindigz National Soccer invitational for ten years  which took  place in Fort Wayne, IN and welcomes some of the top soccer schools to show case their abilities.

In 2019, Shindigz moved its corporate headquarters to downtown Fort Wayne and renovated a 110 year old former department store into an open and creative work environment in the heart of DTFW.

On Dec. 15, 2021, Shindigz told employees and customers that it was temporarily suspending operations “due to the impact of Covid on (its) business and an unforeseen financing issue with (its) bank."

Awards
Indiana's Entrepreneurs of the Year, Indiana Business Magazine, September, 1999
Indiana's 100 Fastest Growing Companies, Indiana University Kelley School of Business
Web Site of the Month, Giftware Business, November, 1999
Top 400 Websites in America, Forbes Magazine, 2000
Catalogers of the Year, Catalog Success Magazine, July 12, 2002
Party Retailer of the Year, Greetings Etc., Feb 13, 2009
Business of the Month Award, Whitley County Chamber of Commerce Ambassadors, January 2011
2012 Party Goods Store TopTenREVIEWS Silver Award, toptenreviews.com, 2012

References

Retail companies of the United States
Companies based in Indiana
Companies based in Fort Wayne, Indiana
Retail companies established in 1926
Printing companies of the United States
1926 establishments in Indiana